John Sterling (born July 4, 1938) is an American sportscaster, best known as the radio play-by-play announcer of Major League Baseball's New York Yankees. Sterling called 5,060 consecutive Yankees games, beginning in 1989, before taking a four-game break in July 2019.

Early life
Sterling grew up on Manhattan's Upper East Side, in the East 80s. He was the son of advertising executive Carl H.T. Sloss. He briefly attended Moravian College, Boston University, and the Columbia University School of General Studies before leaving school to begin his career in radio at a small station in Wellsville, New York.

Broadcasting career

Early career
Sterling began his broadcasting career in Baltimore, where he served as the play-by-play announcer for the then-Baltimore Bullets for the 1970–71 NBA season. He also did play-by-play for Morgan State University football, a role that he held from 1971 to 1978.

Sterling came to New York broadcasting as a talk show host with WMCA in 1971. He later served as the radio voice for the WHA's New York Raiders, the WFL's New York Stars, the NHL's New York Islanders (where he was paired with Bob Lawrence), and the ABA/NBA's New York/New Jersey Nets (where he was paired mainly with Mike DeTomasso). Sterling also did a stretch with the Yankees as pre-game host on WMCA and WINS radio, as well as co-host on cable segments with Mel Allen.

From 1975 through 1980, Sterling announced Nets and Islanders games for WMCA, WVNJ, WOR-TV, and SportsChannel New York, continuing his WMCA talk program until 1978. After his initial stint in New York, Sterling spent nine years in Atlanta hosting a sports call-in show on WSB radio and covering the Braves (1982–1987) and Hawks (1981–1989) for Turner Sports.

New York Yankees (1989–present)
In 1989, Sterling returned to New York to broadcast the games for the Yankees on WABC radio. He has been with the Yankees ever since, currently calling games on WFAN radio and its affiliates in the New York Yankees Radio Network. Since 2005, he has been paired with Suzyn Waldman; past announcing partners include: Jay Johnstone (1989–1990), Joe Angel (1991), Michael Kay (1992–2001), and Charley Steiner (2002–2004). In 2013, the Yankees announced a move to WFAN for ten years, and Sterling was retained. He is currently under contract through the 2022 season.

On October 18, 2021, Sterling signed a new contract with WFAN for 2022 with the potential for a reduced schedule. On June 6, 2022, Sterling announced that he would start working on a reduced schedule in the second half of the MLB season, primarily taking time off from traveling to road games outside of the northeastern United States. He will continue to do road trips to Fenway Park, Citi Field, and Oriole Park at Camden Yards.

On September 20, 2018, as part of a promotion called “Rivalry in the Booth”, Sterling and Red Sox radio broadcaster Joe Castiglione switched places in the fourth inning. From June 29-30, 2019, Sterling called the first MLB games played in Europe.

Sterling took his first days off since 1989 from July 4, 2019 until July 7, 2019.

Sterling's association with the Yankees is not limited to announcing live games over the radio. He is also host of the YES Network's Yankeeography series, which produces biographies of New York Yankees. Among several nominations, Sterling has received two Emmy Awards for the series. He also hosts the introductions and recaps for Yankees Classics. In addition, Sterling has a nightly commentary feature on WCBS newscasts called "Sterling on Sports", in which he gives his take on a recent sporting event or sports news item. This commentary airs nightly during the 6:15 PM sports report.

Sterling and former broadcasting partner Michael Kay commonly work together representing the Yankees. They announce the annual Yankees' Old-Timers' Day. They have presided at the "Key to the City" ceremonies following Yankee World Series victories in 1996, 1998, 1999, 2000 and 2009. The pair often serve as masters of ceremonies on and off the field for major Yankee events, including the 2000 ticker-tape parade held in the Yankees' honor after their World Series win. Sterling has emceed several Yankees pre-game ceremonies including the number retirements of Jorge Posada, Andy Pettitte, Bernie Williams, Joe Torre, Derek Jeter, Mariano Rivera's number retirement in 2013 and Monument Park induction (2016), and the 20th anniversary of the Yankees' 1996 World Series victory in 2016. His long association with the Yankees has earned him the nickname "Pa Pinstripe" from New York Daily News writer Bob Raissman.

In 2022, Sterling reduced his workload by calling fewer games on the road, saying that he was getting tired of making road trips.

Other work
From 2013 through 2017 Sterling announced the Kitten Bowl on the Hallmark Channel.

On December 16, 2018, Sterling called the Brooklyn NetsAtlanta Hawks game on the YES Network.

Announcing mannerisms

Sterling has several idiosyncrasies that mark his broadcasts as distinctive, very unusual, if also divisive. In addition to a colorful vocal personality, Sterling has distinguished himself for sometimes characterizing plays differently than they may appear and for his announcing errors, habits that spark high feelings in fans and lead to comparisons with announcers like Phil Rizzuto.

Following the final out of a Yankees victory, Sterling calls "Ballgame over! Yankees win! Theeeeeee Yankees win!" The length of the word "the" is held longer after dramatic victories, as well as after victories resulting in championships (which Sterling also punctuates by saying the name of whichever series is over). It has been played over the public address system at Yankee Stadium after every Yankees victory for the past several seasons, right before Frank Sinatra's cover of "Theme from New York, New York" is played. The phrase evolved from Sterling's call of Mel Hall's game-winning three-run homer in the ninth inning on May 27, 1991, to give the Yankees a dramatic Memorial Day win over the Boston Red Sox.

One of his signature radio remarks is his home run call "It is high, it is far, it is gone!"  Sterling is known for devising a personalized home run catchphrase for every Yankee player.

For back to back home runs, especially homers from opposite sides of the plate, Sterling references Harry Belafonte's "Zombie Jamboree" by saying "it's a back to back! ... and a belly to belly!" In addition, sometimes before a pitch he will say "theeeeeee pitch", lengthening the word the. If a batter swings and misses, Sterling will often say "cuuuuut on-and-missed", elongating the word cut, followed by on-n-miss pronounced as one quick word. After a strikeout swinging, he says "STRUCK HIM OUT SWINGING!", and for a strikeout looking he calls "STRIIIIKE THREE!", elongating the 'I' in strike.

In all cases when Sterling emphasizes the word "the", as is one of his signatures, he uses not the long ē ("thee") but the schwa ə ("thuh").

Criticism
Sterling's style of play calling is heavily criticized in the media. He is regularly criticized by Craig Carton and Phil Mushnick for his inaccurate calls. Jim Norton of The Opie and Anthony Show routinely mocked Sterling's player nicknames and his emphasis on the "mmm" sound before saying "mmm-it is high, mmm-it is far. ..."

Personal life
Sterling is a resident of Edgewater, New Jersey. He had previously resided in Teaneck, New Jersey. He was divorced in 2008 after 12 years of marriage to wife, Jennifer and is the father of four, including a set of triplets, born in 2000. In January 2015, he was among hundreds of displaced residents after a fire destroyed the Avalon at Edgewater complex building.

In August 2020, Sterling was hospitalized for a blood infection.

On September 1, 2021, after calling a Yankees game remotely from Yankee Stadium, Sterling was stranded in his car about a mile from his home in Edgewater by flooding following Hurricane Ida. Spanish-language Yankees broadcaster Rickie Ricardo, also an Edgewater resident, was driving his Jeep Cherokee home and rescued Sterling.

References

External links

 New York Yankees biography
 Blog dedicated to Sterling

1938 births
Living people
American Basketball Association announcers
American radio sports announcers
Atlanta Braves announcers
Atlanta Hawks announcers
Atlanta Falcons announcers
Boston University alumni
College football announcers
Columbia University School of General Studies alumni
Major League Baseball broadcasters
Moravian University alumni
National Football League announcers
National Hockey League broadcasters
National Basketball Association broadcasters
New York Islanders announcers
New York Nets announcers
New York Yankees announcers
People from Edgewater, New Jersey
People from Teaneck, New Jersey
People from the Upper East Side
People from Wellsville, New York
Sportspeople from New York City
World Football League announcers
YES Network
World Hockey Association broadcasters